This is an episode list of the Fox television series Get a Life. The series starred Chris Elliott as Chris Peterson, a 30-year-old paperboy who still lives with his parents (portrayed by Elinor Donahue and Elliott's real-life dad Bob Elliott). Also starring was Sam Robards as Chris' best friend Larry, Robin Riker as Larry's wife (and Chris' main antagonist) Sharon, and Brian Doyle-Murray as Chris' surly second-season landlord Gus.

Series overview

Episodes

Season 1 (1990–91)

Season 2 (1991–92)

External links
 

Lists of American sitcom episodes
Lists of fantasy television series episodes